Robert E. Scott  (born 25 February 1944 in Nagpur, India) is a Law Professor at Columbia Law School.  Scott graduated from Oberlin College (cum laude) and received his J.D. degree in 1968 from William and Mary Law School where he was editor-in-chief of the William and Mary Law Review. (Scott met his wife, Elizabeth "Buffie" Scott, also a Columbia Law Professor, while at Oberlin College.) Scott earned an S.J.D. from the University of Michigan Law School in 1973, after which he joined the law faculty at William & Mary.

Scott is an oft-cited teacher and scholar in the fields of contracts, commercial law, and bankruptcy. He has co-authored five books on contracts and commercial transactions, is the author of more than three dozen scholarly articles.

In 1974, Scott joined the Virginia School of Law faculty, where he served from 1974 to 2006. He served as Dean of the Law School from 1991 to 2001. Under his leadership, the School completed a $203 million capital campaign in 2000. He also spearheaded the most ambitious building project in the School's history, a $30-million renovation of the David A. Harrison III Law Grounds, completed in 1997, followed by a $7-million law student-faculty meeting and dining center, completed in 2002 and named "Scott Commons." Dr. Scott also instituted the Mary Morton Parsons Seminars in Ethical Values, a program that provides insights into the moral and ethical responsibilities of the lawyer.

In April 2000, the University of Virginia established the Robert E. Scott Distinguished Professorship in Law, made possible by support from more than 250 of his colleagues on the faculty, former students and friends of the school, who committed $1.9 million for the professorship. In 2004, Robert Scott was recognized by the University of Virginia with its highest honor, the Thomas Jefferson Award for his "integrity and honor, bold and skillful leadership, unfailing civility, and uncompromising excellence, qualities that have distinguished Mr. Scott's tenure as dean and his thirty-five years of teaching and scholarship."

Scott became a full-time professor at Columbia Law School in July 2006 after accepting appointment as the Alfred McCormack Professor of Law and Director of the Center on Contract and Economic Organization. He had been a frequent visiting professor at Columbia, most recently as Justin W. D'Atri Visiting Professor of Law, Business and Society from 2001-2006.  In 2007 Scott co-published an article with Alan Schwartz in the Harvard Law Review.

Scott served a number of times as chair of the Association of American Law Schools sections on Contract Law, Law and Economics, and Commercial and Consumer Law. He was elected to the American Academy of Arts and Sciences in 1999 and has been a fellow of the American Bar Foundation since 1993.

On August 5, 2008, Governor Tim Kaine appointed Scott to the Board of Visitors of the College of William & Mary, where Scott earned his law degree in 1968.  In 2012, Scott was reappointed to the Board by governor Bob McDonnell.  Scott's term will expire in 2016.

References

External links
 "Columbia Law School Faculty Profile"

Scholars of contract law
William & Mary Law School alumni
Columbia Law School faculty
Columbia University faculty
1943 births
Living people
University of Michigan Law School alumni
People from Nagpur